Pseudonocardia kongjuensis is a bacterium from the genus of Pseudonocardia which has been isolated from a gold mine near Kongju on Korea.

References

Pseudonocardia
Bacteria described in 2001